Cappelen is a German-origined Norwegian family. Johan von Cappelen immigrated to Norway in 1653, and became bailiff in Lier. A number of his descendants were businessmen, land owners, civil servants and politicians. The family is especially known for the former publishing company J.W. Cappelens Forlag. Variants of the name Cappelen are also used throughout Germany by many other families.

History
The family originated in Cappeln near Wildeshausen in Oldenburg in Lower Saxony, Germany with Johan von Cappelen (1627–1688), who immigrated to Norway from Bremen in 1653. Johan von Cappelen bought several properties and ended as a bailiff in Lier in Buskerud County, Norway. The family's main branches originated from three of his sons:

 Johan von Cappelen junior (1658–1698), after his father was bailiff in Lier, Norway
 Ulrich Friderich von Cappelen (1668–1722), timber merchant and ran a sawmill in Skien in Telemark County, Norway
 Gabriel von Cappelen (1674–1758), timber merchant in Bragernes in Drammen in Buskerud County, Norway

Jørgen Wright Cappelen, a later member of the family, founded the publishing house J. W. Cappelens Forlag. The family in Norway had stopped using the von in the 19th century.

Notable members
Jørgen von Cappelen (1715–1785), titular councillor of state (Etatsråd), businessman and owner of Fossesholm Manor 
Diderich von Cappelen (1734–1794), Skien, merchant, landowner and shipowner
Didrich von Cappelen (1761–1828), Skien, member of the Eidsvoll assembly in 1814
Peder von Cappelen (1763–1837), Drammen, merchant, iron works owner and politician
Ulrich Fredrich von Cappelen (1770–1820), Porsgrunn, merchant and ship-owner
Nicolai Benjamin Cappelen (1795–1866), Skien, county judge and politician
Diderich von Cappelen (1796–1862), acquired and owned Ulefos Jernværk and Holden Manor, Ulefoss
Ulrik Frederik Cappelen (1797–1864), Larvik, county governor and politician
Nils Otto Tank (1800–1864), Wisconsin, missionary and pioneer land developer, son of Catherine von Cappelen married to Carsten Tank
Jørgen Wright Cappelen (1805–78), Oslo (Christiania), founder of the publishing house J.W. Cappelens Forlag
Severin Diderik Cappelen (1822–1881), owner of Ulefos Jernværk and Holden Manor
August Cappelen (1827–52), Düsseldorf, painter
Frants Diecke Cappelen Beyer, Bergen, (1851–1918), composer
Anna Sofie Cappelen (1854–1915), heiress to the Borgestad Manor and married to Prime Minister Gunnar Knudsen
Johan Christian Severin Cappelen (1855–1935), Trondheim, physician and politician 
Diderik Cappelen (1856–1935), chamberlain at the royal court, owner of Ulefos Jernværk and Holden Manor. He discovered the mineral cappelenit that is named after him
Frederick William Cappelen (1857–1921), city engineer in Minneapolis. Cappelen Memorial Bridge is named after him
Axel Cappelen (1858–1919), Stavanger, surgeon
Elias Anton Cappelen Smith (1873–1949), New York City, Norwegian American civil engineer and metallurgist
Didrik Cappelen (1873–1941) (Diddi), Skien, Supreme Court barrister and resistance fighter, father of Didrik and Hans Cappelen
Johan Munthe Cappelen (1884–1962), judge
Didrik Arup Seip (1884–1963), professor at University of Oslo (descendant through his father's maternal grandmother)
Didrik Cappelen Schiøtt (1887–1958), Skien, married to Margit Schiøtt, member of Stortinget, the Norwegian parliament
Johan Cappelen (1889–1947), Trondheim, Supreme Court barrister, county governor and Minister of Justice
Carl Otto Løvenskiold (1898–1969), Bærum, landowner (descendant through his maternal grandfather Diderik Cappelen Blom (1834–1894)) 
Didrik Cappelen (1900–1970) (Dixe), Skien, resistance fighter, county judge and politician
Jørgen Mathiesen (1901–1993), Eidsvoll, landowner (descendant through his maternal grandmother Martine Cappelen Kiær) 
Hans Cappelen (1903–1979) (Hasse), Oslo, businessman, resistance fighter and Norwegian witness in the Nuremberg trials
Nic Waal (Caroline Schweigaard Nicolaysen) (1905–1960), Oslo, psychiatrist (descendant of Diderich von Cappelen (1796–1862))
Ferdinand Finne (1910–1999), Oslo, painter (descendant of Severin Diderik Cappelen)
Johan Zeier Cappelen (1913–2007), Oslo, ambassador
Andreas Zeier Cappelen (1915–2008), Stavanger, justiciar, government minister (several posts including Foreign Minister)
Bodil Cappelen (born 1930), artist
Peder Wright Cappelen (1931–1992), Bærum, author, publisher and father of Herman Cappelen 
Trond Reinertsen (born 1945), Trondheim, economist and business leader (descendant through E.A.Smith)
Pål Cappelen (born 1947), handball player
Johan Kristoffer Cappelen Stensrud (born 1953), Stavanger, one of Skagen Funds founders
Berit Bertling Cappelen (born 1966), novelist
Herman Cappelen (born 1967), philosopher
Thomas Cappelen Malling (born 1970), author and director  
Sofie Cappelen (born 1982), actress
Sebastian Cappelen (born 1990), Danish professional golfer

Gallery

Coat of arms

The family coat of arms were lawfully assumed in Norway in 1683: The shield is parted in two fields, the first and upper one having the mother pelican feeding its young with its own blood (a pelican in its piety), and the second field has three blooming roses with leaves and stems.  On top of the shield is a helmet with a crest: two buffalo horns and between them the symbol of Fortune being a naked woman holding a ship's sail in her hands and standing on an orb.

The Ulefoss-line of the family has, however, dropped Fortune and uses the two horns only. The various lines of the family have different heraldic colours (tinctures) in the arms.

In Germany the family used a merchant's mark.

References

Other sources
 Thomle, E. A. (1896) Familien (von) Cappelen i Norge og Danmark (Christiania: J.W. Cappelens Forlag) 
Haagen Krog Steffens (1911): Norske Slægter 1912, Gyldendalske Boghandel, Kristiania 1911
Cappelen, Hans (1988) Familien Cappelens tyske opprinnelse. Noen antagelser og hypoteser (in Norsk Slektshistorisk Tidsskrift, Oslo, 31 (1988): 378–396)
 Haugen, Lambrecht (2008) Cappelen-slekten 1627–2008 (Rosendal)

Norwegian families
Patriciate of Norway

Surnames
Norwegian-language surnames
Norwegian people of German descent
Families of German ancestry